Piotr Łossowski (born 25 February 1925) is a Polish historian and professor. Lecturer at Collegium Civitas. Member of the Historical Committee of Polish Academy of Sciences. He specializes in the areas of foreign politics and diplomacy and history of the Second Polish Republic, military history of Poland in the years 1918–1920, history of the Baltic states and their relations with Poland. He gained major recognition for his works on the state of Polish diplomacy in the time of the Second Republic.

Editor in chief of Studia z Dziejów Rosji i Europy Środkowej-Wschodniej (Studies the History of Russia and East-Central Europe) journal.

Selected publications
Agresja hitlerowska na Polskę (1964)
Stosunki polsko-litewskie 1918–1920 (1966)
Żołnierze minionych lat (1969)
Kraje bałtyckie na drodze od demokracji parliamentarnej do dyktatury (1972)
Między wojną a pokojem (1976)
Litwa a sprawy polskie 1939–1949 (1982)
Po tej i po tamtej stronie Niemna: Stosunki polsko-litewskie 1883–1939 (1985)
Zerwane pęta: Usunięcie okupantów z ziem polskich w listopadzie 1918 (1986)
Polska w Europie i świecie (1992)
Stosunki polsko-estońskie (1992)
Historia dyplomacji polskiej, t.4 (red.) (1995)
Konflikt polsko-litewski 1918–1920 (1996)
Stosunki polsko-litewskie 1921–1939 (1997)
Jak Feniks z popiołów. Oswobodzenie ziem polskich spod okupacji (1998)
Litwa / Historia państw świata XX wieku (2001)
Dyplomacja polska 1918–1939 (2001)

References

Footnotes

1925 births
Living people
People from Kalisz
20th-century Polish historians
Polish male non-fiction writers
Recipients of the Order of the White Star, 5th Class